Windsor is a 2015 American independent drama film written, directed and produced by Porter Farrell and starring Madelyn Deutch, Quinn Shephard, Nick Krause, Adam Hicks, Peyton Clark, Ian Colletti and Barry Corbin. The film is Farrell's directorial debut.

Plot
In their last year of high school, six best friends prepare to leave their small, struggling hometown, a place caught in the slow, fine-grinding wheels of American big business that seem to leave no side doors.

Maisie, whose father is about to be released from prison, decides she can't leave the town where she has been embraced so lovingly since the dark day when her father nearly killed the man whose company foreclosed on their family farm. The town's patriarch, Gil Denton, a no nonsense, wealthy landowner dying from cancer, loves these six kids, and in his remaining time with them he serves as a sounding board, dependable guide, and sympathetic friend - while providing them a wistful link to a past they will never know.

Set in current time, the story shows that small town values are worth saving and that the mouse does indeed occasionally roar.

Cast
Madelyn Deutch as Maisie
Quinn Shephard as Kat
Nick Krause as Lawton
Adam Hicks as Clint
Peyton Clark as Itchy
Ian Colletti as Jesse
Barry Corbin as Gil Denton
Mackenzie Astin as Harry Barnett
Stelio Savante as Pierre Gandy
Emily Warfield as Carolyn Barnett
Sonny Carl Davis as Kline
Richard Jackson as Tommy
Libby Villari as Louise
Rodger Boyce as Parole Board Chairman
Greg Williams as Radio DJ

Production
Farrell had written the part of Gil Denton specifically for Corbin to portray. Early in development, Jake T. Austin was attached to the project.  The film was shot in Gainesville, Texas.

Awards
The film won Best Narrative Feature at the Garden State Film Festival in New Jersey.

References

External links
 
 

American independent films
Films set in Texas
Films shot in Texas
American drama films
2015 directorial debut films
2015 films
2010s English-language films
2010s American films